Jose Carbajal may refer to:

José Carbajal (Uruguayan musician) (1943–2010)
 José María Jesús Carbajal (1809–1874) Mexican freedom fighter